Erin Donohue (born May 8, 1983) is an American athlete who competes in middle-distance track events. Donohue qualified for the U.S. Olympic team at the 2008 Summer Olympics in the 1500 meters.

Born in Philadelphia, Pennsylvania, Donohue competed for Haddonfield Memorial High School in Haddonfield, New Jersey and the University of North Carolina in both middle-distance running events and the javelin throw.

At the 2010 IAAF World Indoor Championships in Doha, she was sixth in the 1500 m final, running a season's best 4:09. She was the silver medalist at the 2010 USA Outdoor Track and Field Championships behind Anna Pierce. Donohue took part in the Fifth Avenue Mile road race in September and finished in third place behind her compatriots Shannon Rowbury and Sara Hall.

Donohue has been a resident of Haddon Heights, New Jersey.

She is an assistant coach with the Philadelphia University Cross Country program.

References

External links
 
 
 
 
 
 
 

1983 births
Living people
American female middle-distance runners
Haddonfield Memorial High School alumni
People from Haddon Heights, New Jersey
People from Haddonfield, New Jersey
Sportspeople from Camden County, New Jersey
Athletes (track and field) at the 2008 Summer Olympics
Olympic track and field athletes of the United States
North Carolina Tar Heels women's track and field athletes
Track and field athletes from New Jersey